Lake Komi was a prehistoric periglacial lake formed in the region of the present-day Russian Komi Republic when the Barents Sea outlet of the Pechora River was blocked by ice during, at least, Major glacial 4 of 4, of the Pleistocene. The latter was the last series of ice ages (glacials), which spans more than two million years.

Notes

External links
 The Center for Coastal and Ocean Mapping, Joint Hydrographic Center (CCOM/JHC) at the University of New Hampshire provides an excellent Flash animation of the probable drainage outburst of Lake Komi following some glacial retreat: . For reference, the large moon-shaped island, top-center in the animation, is Novaya Zemlya, and the mountains to the right are the northernmost Urals.

Komi
Glaciology
Komi